The Central Ranges xeric scrub is a deserts and xeric shrublands ecoregion of Australia.

Location and description
The region consists of sandy plains with some areas of rocky highland. These plains have a dry climate but do get some rain in both summer and winter. This area contains the remote city of Alice Springs while the grasslands are home to a number of Indigenous Australian communities or are used for cattle grazing.

This ecoregion contains four Interim Biogeographic Regionalisation for Australia (IBRA) bioregions – Burt Plain, Central Ranges, Finke, and MacDonnell Ranges.

Flora
This ecoregion includes the Central Australian Mountain Ranges Centres of Plant Diversity. The habitats consists of thick, tough spinifex grassland with some wooded areas of myall and desert oak (Acacia coriacea). The region and the MacDonnell Ranges in particular are home to a number of specialised endemic plant species including the cabbage palms of Palm Valley in Finke Gorge National Park.

Fauna
Birds include the red-tailed black cockatoo and the spinifexbird while animals include the black-flanked rock-wallaby population of the MacDonnell Ranges and the green tree frog.

Conservation and threats
Overgrazing by cattle and introduced animals including horses, donkeys and rabbits are a threat to habitats.

Protected areas
Protected areas include Finke Gorge National Park, Tjoritja / West MacDonnell National Park, and Watarrka National Park.

References

Further reading
 Thackway, R and I D Cresswell (1995) An interim biogeographic regionalisation for Australia : a framework for setting priorities in the National Reserves System Cooperative Program Version 4.0 Canberra : Australian Nature Conservation Agency, Reserve Systems Unit, 1995. 

Biogeography of the Northern Territory
Biogeography of South Australia
Biogeography of Western Australia
Deserts and xeric shrublands
Ecoregions of Australia